Gott may refer to:

 Gott (surname), including a list of people with the name
 Gott, Argyll and Bute, a location in Scotland
 Gott, Shetland, a village in Tingwall, Shetland, Scotland
 Gottschalks, whose stock symbol on the Pink Sheets was GOTT but now is GOTTQ

See also 
 
 GOT (disambiguation)